Otwell Johnson was a successful merchant in England during the reign of Henry VIII. His chronicle is one of the main sources detailing the execution of Henry's fifth wife, Katherine Howard.

References

Year of birth missing
Year of death missing
16th-century merchants
16th-century English people
People of the Tudor period